A list of films produced by the Marathi language film industry based in Maharashtra in the year 1978.

1978 Releases
A list of Marathi films released in 1978.

References

Lists of 1978 films by country or language
1978
1978 in Indian cinema